The Eastshore and Suburban Railway (E&SR) was a formerly independent unit of the historic San Francisco Bay Area Key System which ran streetcar trains in Richmond, California, San Pablo, and El Cerrito. There were several lines with terminals at Point Richmond, North Richmond, the county line with Alameda County (a transfer point), what is now San Pablo, and Grand Canyon/East Richmond/Alvarado Park. Service to Oakland required a transfer to Oakland Traction Company trains at the County Line station and service to San Francisco required an additional transfer in Oakland. The systems were later consolidated into the Key System. Service began to be replaced by buses beginning on August 1, 1932, with the conversion of the East Richmond/23rd Street line to buses. Lines were converted to buses one at a time with the last remaining line being in September 1933. Fares were originally 5 cents and were raised to 7 cents over time at the time of the last runs.

Timeline

1900s

1900 
August 13: The contract to build a street railway is granted for the Eastshore and Suburban Railway by the Contra Costa County supervisors way. However, the planned route requires crossing Santa Fe Railroad track so legal complications arise.

1902 
January 10: William S. Rheem, the President of the Standard Oil refinery (commonly known today as Chevron), organizes the Richmond Belt Line Railroad to provide service to the refinery.

1904 
May 2: Rheem purchases the street railway franchise; he organizes it into the East Shore & Suburban Railway.

July 7: The East Shore & Suburban Railway commences operations, running from the Standard Oil refinery in Point Richmond to the Southern Pacific depot at 18th & Macdonald. Just about the entire town turns out for the opening ceremonies. The fare is five cents.

1905 
January: Two new lines are placed in service. The first, runs north from 6th & Macdonald to near the Santa Fe tracks in North Richmond (this line ran north on 6th Street to Barrett, east on Barrett for two blocks, and then north on 8th Street to about Lincoln Avenue). On Ohio Street, the second runs west from 3rd & Ohio (Maple Hall) to where the new line joined the main line on Ashland Avenue (now Garrard Blvd). People came from miles around on Saturday nights to Maple Hall, where all enjoyed dining, dancing, and drinking. Extra cars had to be borrowed from other lines to get the crowds home at closing time.

October: A major new extension opens. It runs east on Macdonald Avenue from the SP Depot at 18th Street to San Pablo Avenue, then south on San Pablo Avenue to the Contra Costa/Alameda County Line. At the county line, passengers can transfer to a car for Oakland. The streetcar tracks cross the SP at 18th Street in Richmond, but since there is a city ordinance that forbids loaded streetcars from crossing the SP tracks, passengers must walk across the SP tracks from one streetcar to another.

November: The land for the car barn at 19th & Macdonald is purchased.

December: Two new extensions are placed into service: i) The Ohio Street line is extended east to 14th Street and then south on 14th Street to Potrero Avenue; and ii) the 6th Street line is extended south of Macdonald to join the Ohio Street line.

1906 
January: Planning starts for a subway on Macdonald Avenue under the SP so that the East Shore & Suburban can avoid crossing the SP tracks.

February: A new line to San Pablo is placed into service. It runs north from Macdonald on 23rd Street and then turns east on Market Avenue, running five blocks to Church Lane.

Ingersoll-County Line station is built on San Pablo Avenue at the Contra Costa/Alameda county line. It bridges Cerrito Creek and is covered so that passengers can easily transfer between the Oakland cars and the Richmond cars in any weather. The station is named in honor of Mr. Ingersoll, a very popular conductor on the line.

February 17: The East Shore & Suburban purchases a site in Stege where the line intends to build “Eastshore Park”. Construction of the park, a dance pavilion, and a roller skating rink commences in March, as does construction of a new line to get passengers there. The line splits off the San Pablo Avenue main line at Potrero Avenue (this point will later be named “Stege Junction”) and continues west on Potrero Avenue to about 49th Street.

April 1: Service to the Eastshore Park station begins.

April 6: The famous 1906 San Francisco earthquake hits. The East Shore & Suburban is soon carrying hundreds to a 15-acre refugee camp that had been quickly put together in San Pablo by Standard Oil. “Camp Rockefeller” was near the end of the San Pablo line, on Market Street between Church Lane and 23rd Street.

1907 
September 1: The contract is signed to build the subway on Macdonald Avenue under the SP.

October: The west end of the line is extended another half-mile into the Standard Oil refinery as far as the asphalt plant.

Late 1907: John Nicholl announces the formation of the “Richmond Railway and Navigation Company”. He intends to run a competing street railway and also provide ferry service to San Francisco. Col. Rheem promptly takes care of this problem by buying the new company.

References

External links 
Chronology of E&SR
Photograph of E&SR streetcar

Richmond, California
History of Contra Costa County, California
Transportation in Contra Costa County, California
Railway companies disestablished in 1933
Defunct California railroads